The 2002 Speedway World Cup Final was the fifth and last race of the 2002 Speedway World Cup season. It took place on August 10, 2002 at the East of England Showground in Peterborough, Great Britain.

Results

Heat details

References

See also 
 2002 Speedway World Cup
 motorcycle speedway

!